#1 Spot is a music compilation album distributed by Def Jam.  Released June 14, 2005, it features seventeen hip hop R&B hits in chronological order which were released since the launch of the record label in 1985 until 2003, including releases under the Island and the now-defunct Def Soul imprints.  Hence the title of the album (which was inspired by a song by Ludacris), all went to the number-one spot on the Billboard R&B chart, with five songs reaching the Billboard Hot 100 number-one spot:  This Is How We Do It, Incomplete, Always on Time, Foolish and Stand Up.

Track listing
The Rain - Oran "Juice" Jones
I Need Love - LL Cool J 
This Is How We Do It - Montell Jordan  
I'll Be There for You/You're All I Need to Get By - Mary J. Blige and Method Man  
In My Bed - Dru Hill
Never Make a Promise - Dru Hill 
Let's Ride - Master P, Montell Jordan and Silkk the Shocker 
Friend of Mine - Kelly Price, R. Kelly and Ronald Isley 
How Deep Is Your Love - Dru Hill and Redman
Get It on Tonite - Montell Jordan 
Incomplete - Sisqo
Missing You - Case
Always on Time - Ja Rule and Ashanti 
Foolish - Ashanti
Luv U Better - LL Cool J  
Excuse Me Miss - Jay-Z and Pharrell Williams  
Stand Up - Ludacris and Shawnna

References

Def Jam Recordings compilation albums
2006 compilation albums
Rhythm and blues compilation albums
Albums produced by Tim & Bob